Malachius aeneus, the scarlet malachite beetle, is a species of soft-winged flower beetle in the family Melyridae. The beetle was  introduced to North America in 1852, and is now widespread. The larvae are frequently found near cereal crops and are known predators of Brassicogethes aeneus in Great Britain.

References

Further reading

External links

 

Melyridae
Beetles described in 1758
Taxa named by Carl Linnaeus